Costanzo de Sarnano, O.F.M. Conv. or Gasparo Torri (1531–1595) was a Roman Catholic cardinal.

Biography
On 12 Jul 1587, he was consecrated bishop by Girolamo Bernerio, Bishop of Ascoli Piceno, with Giovanni Battista Albani, Titular Patriarch of Alexandria, and Agostino Quinzio, bishop of Korčula, serving as co-consecrators.

Episcopal succession

References

1531 births
1595 deaths
16th-century Italian cardinals
Conventual Franciscan bishops